Eudialyte group is a group of complex trigonal zircono- and, more rarely, titanosilicate minerals with general formula [N(1)N(2)N(3)N(4)N(5)]3[M(1a)M(1b)]3M(2)3M(4)Z3[Si24O72]O'4X2, where N(1) and N(2) and N(3) and N(5) = Na+ and more rarely H3O+ or H2O, N(4) = Na+, Sr2+, Mn2+ and more rarely H3O+ or H2O or K+ or Ca2+ or REE3+ (rare earth elements), M(1) and M(1b) = Ca2+, M(1a) = Ca2+ or Mn2+ or Fe2+, M(2) = Fe (both II and III), Mn and rarely Na+, K+ or Zr4+, M(3) = Si, Nb and rarely W, Ti and [] (vacancy), M(4) = Si and or rarely [], Z Zr4+ and or rarely Ti4+, and X = OH−, Cl− and more rarely CO32− or F−. Some of the eudialyte-like structures can even be more complex, however, in general, its typical feature is the presence of [Si3O9]6− and [Si9O27]18− ring silicate groups. Space group is usually R3m or R-3m but may be reduced to R3 due to cation ordering. Like other zirconosilicates, the eudialyte group minerals possess alkaline ion-exchange properties, as microporous materials.

List of the eudialyte-group minerals

Approved species
 Alluaivite -  (space group R-3m)
 Andrianovite -  (space group R3m)
 Aqualite -  (space group R3)
 Carbokentbrooksite -  (space group R3m)
 Davinciite -  (space group R3m)
 Dualite -  (space group R3m)
 Eudialyte -  (space group R-3m)
 Feklichevite -  (space group R3m)
 Fengchengite -  (space group R-3m)
 Ferrokentbrooksite -  (space group R3m)
 Georgbarsanovite -  (space group R3m)
 Golyshevite -  (space group R3m)
 Ikranite -  (space group R3m)
 Ilyukhinite -  - the most recent add (space group R3m)
 Johnsenite-(Ce) -  (space group R3m)
 Kentbrooksite -  (space group R3m)
 Khomyakovite -  (space group R3m)
 Labyrinthite -  (space group R3)
 Manganokhomyakovite -  (space group R3m)
 Manganoeudialyte -  (space group R3m)
 Mogovidite -  (space group R3m)
 Oneillite -  (space group R3)
 Raslakite -  (space group R3)
 Rastsvetaevite -  (space group R3m)
 Taseqite -  (space group R3m)
 Voronkovite -  (space group R3)
 Zirsilite-(Ce) -  (space group R3m)

Unnamed species

The list of eudialyte-related natural phases is growing. There are many such phases, some of them very complex, coded "UM" by the International Mineralogical Association, and include:

 UM-1971-22-SiO:CaClFeHMgMnNaNbZr -  - with variable substitution of OH for oxygen
 UM1990-79-SiO:CaClFeHMnNaNbREEZr -  - first representative with magnesium-dominant site
 UM1990-80- SiO:CaFeHMnNaNbREEZr - 
 UM1998-21-SiO:CaCeClHMnNaZr - 
 UM1999-36-SiO:CaCeHMnNaNbSrZr - 
 UM2000-66-SiO:CaClFeHMnNaNbSrZr - 
 UM2003-39- SiO:CaClFeHHfNaNbSrTaTiZr - 
 UM2004-51-SiO:CaClFFeHNaNbTi' - 
 UM2006-17-SiO:CaClFFeHMnNaZr - 
 UM2006-18-SiO:CaClFFeHMnNaZr -  - with essential sulfur and with Zr dominant in two sites
 UM2006-28-SiO:CaHMnNaZr -  - with double c unit cell dimension

In addition, there is "eudialyte 3248": , plus admixtures of Ce, Sr, Ba and Y, characterized by one S-dominant site (not shown in the simplified formula)

Other species
Rastsvetaeva et al. (2015) describe a species tentatively called "hydrorastsvetaevite", with a formula .

Further reading

Rastsvetaeva, R. K.; Chukanov, N. V.; Zaitsev, V. A.; Aksenov, S. M.; Viktorova, K. A. (2018-05). "Crystal Structure of Cl-Deficient Analogue of Taseqite from Odikhincha Massif". Crystallography Reports. 63 (3): 349–357. doi:10.1134/s1063774518030240. ISSN 1063-7745

References

External links
 Mindat.org
 The Eudialyte homepage

Cyclosilicates
Zirconium minerals
Sodium minerals